Selina Frey-Sander (born February 19, 1999) is a German female acrobatic gymnast. With partners Daniela Mehlhaff and Janina Hiller, Frey-Sander competed in the 2014 Acrobatic Gymnastics World Championships.

References

1999 births
Living people
German acrobatic gymnasts
Female acrobatic gymnasts